The discography of British singer Anne-Marie consists of two studio albums, one extended play, twenty-six singles (including eleven as a featured artist), and two promotional singles. She has attained several charting singles on the UK Singles Chart, including Clean Bandit's "Rockabye", featuring Sean Paul, which peaked at number one, as well as "Alarm", "Ciao Adios", "Friends" and "2002". Her debut studio album, Speak Your Mind, was released on 27 April 2018 and peaked at number three on the UK Albums Chart.

Studio albums

Extended play

Singles

As lead artist

As featured artist

Promotional singles

Other charted songs

Guest appearances

Songwriting credits

Notes

References

 
 
Discographies of British artists